Genting Highlands is a hill station located on the peak of Mount Ulu Kali in the Titiwangsa Mountains, central  Peninsular Malaysia, at 1,800 metres elevation. Located in the state of Pahang. It was established in 1965 by the late Chinese businessman Lim Goh Tong. The primary tourist attraction is Resorts World Genting, a hill resort where casinos and theme parks are situated and where gambling is permitted, which is uncommon in a Muslim country.

History

The idea to build a hill resort near the capital city of Kuala Lumpur came from a late Malaysian Chinese businessman, Lim Goh Tong who was inspired by the fresh air in Cameron Highlands during his business trip there in 1963 for a hydroelectric power project. The rationale was that Cameron Highlands was too far away from Kuala Lumpur, and therefore building a mountain resort nearer to Kuala Lumpur would have excellent business potential. After researching Kuala Lumpur's maps and surrounding areas, Lim identified Mount Ulu Kali in Genting Sempah, 58 km from Kuala Lumpur, to be ideal for his plan.

On 18 August 1965, a technical and construction team began to construct the access road from Genting Sempah to the peak of Mount Ulu Kali. On 31 March 1969, the late Tunku Abdul Rahman, Malaysia's first prime minister, laid the foundation stone for the company's pioneer hotel, marking the completion of the access road to Genting Highlands Resort. The resort was also granted the casino license the same year by the Malaysian government to develop its gambling industry. An area midway to the peak was turned into the Gohtong Jaya township. In 1971, the first hotel at Genting Highlands was completed and was named Highlands Hotel (now renamed Theme Park Hotel).

Since then, Genting Highlands Resort has expanded, with six more hotels being built within 2017. They are Genting Hotel (renamed Genting Grand, 1981), Awana (1984), Resort Hotel (1992), Highlands Hotel (1997), First World Hotel (2001), and Crockfords (2017). The resort ventured into the amusement park and entertainment industry by launching the Genting Grand Indoor Theme Park in 1992, Genting Outdoor Theme Park in 1994, Arena of Stars in 1998 and First World Plaza Indoor Theme Park in 2001.

In 2013, Genting Group implemented a 10-year master plan named Genting Integrated Tourism Plan (GITP) to develop, expand, enhance and refurbish hotels, theme parks, and infrastructure at Genting Highlands. The project with different phases involves a new 1,300 rooms hotel expansion to the current First World Hotel, a new 10,000 seats arena, renovation of the First World Plaza Indoor Theme Park, and reconverting the Genting Outdoor Theme Park to 20th Century Fox World. A dispute with 20th Century Fox, which was purchased by The Walt Disney Company, resulted in the theme park being rebranded as Genting SkyWorlds. In 2019, the refurbishment of the infrastructure at the resort has been completed, with only the outdoor theme park still being renovated and expected to be completed in early 2021.

Climate

Attractions

Resorts World Genting

Resorts World Genting (Abbreviation: RWG), originally known as Genting Highlands Resort, is an integrated hill resort owned by Genting Group through subsidiary Genting Malaysia Berhad which comprises hotels, shopping malls, theme parks and casinos. It is the main attraction of the hill station, located within the Pahang section of the area.

Accommodations

Resorts World Genting has seven hotels, with one of them being a leisure resort. One of the seven accommodations, First World Hotel, held the Guinness World Record as the largest hotel globally from 2006 until 2008 and regained the title in 2015 with 7,351 rooms following Tower 2A. In 2018, Forbes Travel Guide Star Ratings awarded 4-star rating and 'recommended' citation to Genting Grand and Maxims respectively.

Crockfords at Resorts World Genting was awarded the 5-star rating in 2019 & 2020, making it the first and only hotel in Malaysia to achieve this award.

Theme parks

There are currently three theme parks at Resort World Genting, Genting SkyWorlds (formerly Genting Outdoor Theme Park), Skytropolis Funland (formerly First World Plaza Indoor Theme Park) and Genting Grand Indoor Theme Park. Genting Outdoor Theme Park was opened in 1994 with 31 rides at its peak, including a monorail service. It was closed on 1 September 2013 to make way for the construction of world's first 20th Century Fox World. However, due to disputes between Genting Malaysia Berhad, Fox Entertainment Group and The Walt Disney Company over the theme park after the purchase of 20th Century Fox by The Walt Disney Company, Genting and Walt Disney filed civil suits over each other. On the 26th of July 2019, following an agreement between Disney and Fox which granted Genting Malaysia Berhad a license to utilise certain Fox intellectual properties, the theme park was eventually rebranded as Genting SkyWorlds. Genting Skyworlds is expected to open in June 2021 after completion was delayed from 2016 to 2018 and then to 2020. However, due to the coronavirus pandemic, construction works had to be closed down and the opening date was postponed, but no definite date has been given on the new opening date, although works have been mostly completed. In March 2022, Genting SkyWorlds is finally open to public for its soft launching, official launch date is yet to confirm.

First World Plaza Indoor Theme Park was opened in 2001 with 12 rides at its peak and was closed from June 2017 to February 2018 for refurbishment. On 8 December 2018, it was opened to the public and rebranded as Skytropolis Indoor Theme Park, with some attractions mimicking older attractions of the former indoor and outdoor theme parks. The theme park also included the first Asian branch of VOID, a US-based operator of unique fully immersive virtual reality attraction, which officially opened on 6 December 2018 on a  section of Skytropolis Indoor Theme Park.

Genting Grand Indoor Theme Park was opened in 1992, located at the lower floor of Genting Grand Hotel and consists of two children rides and one amusement arcade – Vision City Video Games Park.

Casino
Resorts World Genting is the only legal land-based casino area in the country. There are two main casino outlets in the resort, Genting Casino in Genting Grand Complex and SkyCasino in SkyAvenue Mall.

Shopping Malls
There are currently five shopping malls at the resort, Awana Sky Central, First World Plaza, Genting Highlands Premium Outlets, SkyAvenue, and Genting Grand Complex. Two shopping malls, Awana SkyCentral and Genting Highlands Premium Outlet, is near Gohtong Jaya and are connected by two link bridges. The three remaining malls are situated at the mountain top.

Zouk Genting

See Main Article: Zouk (Club)

In 2015, Genting Hong Kong Limited, a part of the Genting Group, purchased the Singaporean nightlife brand Zouk. At this time, Zouk already had a second outlet in Kuala Lumpur, Malaysia. In 2019, Zouk opened its third outlet in Resorts World Genting. This Genting outlet of Zouk features the main Empire Nightclub, FUHU Dining (a Chinese-themed restaurant), and RedTail Bar (consisting of a games bar, a sports bar and a karaoke section).

Zouk continued its close collaboration with the Resorts World brand by subsequently opening another outlet inside Resorts World Las Vegas in 2022.

Amenities

The resort has two performance venues and a cineplex.
 Arena of Stars is a concert hall with a capacity of 5,132 seats.
 Genting International Showroom is a multimedia entertainment venue with up to 1,000 seating capacity.
 Bona Cinemas at SkyAvenue is their first outlet outside China. The cinema consists of 6 cinema halls equipped with Dolby Atmos sound systems and IMAX halls.

Events

Resorts World Genting has hosted several events over the years, such as awards ceremonies, concerts, and competitions which are:

 Anugerah Bintang Popular Berita Harian
 ESL One Genting 2017
 Genting World Lion Dance Championship
 IIFA Awards 2002
 Malaysian Idol
 Malaysia National Lion Dance Championship
 MTV Asia Awards 2008
 My Astro Music Awards
 Star Idol Malaysia
 Tour de Langkawi (Finishing line of climb stage)

Other attractions

Other tourist attractions at Genting Highlands are Chin Swee Caves Temple - the sole Buddhist temple named after Ancient Chinese monk Qingshui, Mohamed Noah Foundation Mosque - the sole mosque named after late politician and co-founder of Genting Group Mohamed Noah Omar, Gohtong Memorial Park - memorial and cemetery of the late founder Lim Goh Tong, two agricultural centres Mini Cameron Highlands and Genting Strawberry Leisure Farms and sole apiary and insectarium - Happy Bee Farm, Insect World and Butterfly Wonderland.

Government and politics
At the federal level, Genting Highlands is part of the Bentong parliamentary constituency in Pahang, currently represented by DAP's Young Syefura Othman, and the Hulu Selangor parliamentary constituency in Selangor, currently represented by Mohd Hasnizan Harun of PAS.

On the state level, Genting Highlands falls under the Ketari constituency of the Pahang State Legislative Assembly, currently held by Su Keong Siong of the DAP, and the Batang Kali constituency of the Selangor State Legislative Assembly, currently held by Harumaini Omar of PEJUANG.

Genting Highlands falls within the municipal boundaries of the Bentong Municipal Council (Majlis Perbandaran Bentong) and the Hulu Selangor Municipal Council (Majlis Perbandaran Hulu Selangor). Since 2020, Genting Highlands has also been an autonomous sub-district (daerah kecil) within Bentong District.

References

External links
 Genting Highlands Information Website

 
Resorts in Malaysia
Casinos in Malaysia
Casinos completed in 1995
Amusement parks in Malaysia
Hill stations in Malaysia
Tourist attractions in Pahang
Populated places in Pahang
Towns in Pahang
Buildings and structures in Pahang
Titiwangsa Mountains